James S. Norris (1810 – March 5, 1874) was a Democratic politician from Minnesota Territory. Born in Monmouth, Maine, Norris moved to St. Croix Falls, Wisconsin in 1839. He later moved to Minnesota, settling on a farm in Cottage Grove, Minnesota in 1842. He was elected to the first Minnesota Territorial Legislature in 1849 and re-elected in 1854. In 1855, he served as the Speaker of the Minnesota Territory House of Representatives. He attended the state's Democratic Constitutional Convention in 1857. In 1870 he was elected to the Minnesota House of Representatives. He died in Cottage Grove in 1874.

References

1874 deaths
1810 births
Members of the Minnesota Territorial Legislature
Democratic Party members of the Minnesota House of Representatives
19th-century American politicians
People from Monmouth, Maine
People from Cottage Grove, Minnesota